Danny Thomas (born Amos Muzyad Yaqoob Kairouz; January 6, 1912 – February 6, 1991) was an American actor, singer, nightclub comedian, producer, and philanthropist. He created and starred in the Danny Thomas Show. In addition to guest roles on many of the comedy, talk, and musical variety programs of his time, his legacy includes a lifelong dedication to fundraising for charity. Most notably, he was the founder of St. Jude Children's Research Hospital in Memphis, Tennessee, a leading center in pediatric medicine with a focus on pediatric cancer. St. Jude now has affiliate hospitals in eight other American cities as of early 2020.

Already a successful entertainer, Thomas began his film career in 1947, playing opposite child actress Margaret O'Brien in The Unfinished Dance (1947) and Big City (1948). He then starred in the long-running television sitcom Make Room for Daddy (later, The Danny Thomas Show from the fourth season onwards) from 1953 to 1964, in which he played the lead role of Danny Williams. He was the father of Marlo Thomas, Terre Thomas, and Tony Thomas.

Early life 

One of 10 children, Danny Thomas was born Amos Muzyad Yaqoob Kairouz on January 6, 1912, in Deerfield, Michigan, to Charles Yaqoob Kairouz and his wife Margaret Taouk. His parents were Maronite Catholic immigrants from Bsharri, Lebanon. Thomas was raised in Toledo, Ohio, attending St. Francis de Sales Church, Woodward High School, and finally the University of Toledo, where he was a member of Tau Kappa Epsilon fraternity. Bishop Samuel Stritch of Toledo confirmed Thomas in the Catholic Church. Stritch, a native of Tennessee, was a lifelong spiritual advisor for Thomas, and would later advise him to locate the St. Jude Hospital in Memphis. He married Rose Marie Cassaniti in 1936, a week after his 24th birthday.

In 1932, Thomas began performing on radio in Detroit at WMBC on The Happy Hour Club. Thomas first performed under his anglicized birth name, "Amos Jacobs Kairouz." After he moved to Chicago in 1940, Thomas did not want his friends and family to know he went back into working clubs where the salary was better, so he came up with the pseudonym "Danny Thomas" (after two of his brothers).

He was living in Ward 6, Toledo, Lucas County, Ohio, according to the 1920 United States Census as Amos Jacobs, the same in the 1930 Census, and in 1940 living in Ward 2, Detroit, Wayne County, Michigan, as Amos J. Jacobs, a radio and theatrical artist. Further, the 1930 Census states his parents were born in Syria; while the 1920 census states that they were born in "Seria," and that their mother tongue is "Serian." At the time, Lebanon was part of the Ottoman Empire (until 1920) and Lebanese immigrants were identified as Syrians in most of the world and as Turks in Latin America.

Careers other than television

Radio 
Thomas first reached mass audiences on network radio in the 1940s playing shifty brother-in-law Amos in The Bickersons, which began as sketches on the music-comedy show Drene Time, starring Don Ameche and Frances Langford. Thomas also portrayed himself as a scatterbrained Lothario on this show. His other network radio work included a stint as Jerry Dingle the postman on Fanny Brice's The Baby Snooks Show. In the early 1950s he made several appearances on the popular NBC variety program, The Big Show, hosted by stage legend Tallulah Bankhead.

Thomas also had his own radio program, The Danny Thomas Show. The 30-minute weekly variety show was on ABC from 1942 to 1943 and on CBS from 1947 to 1948.

Films 
After his two late 1940s films with Margaret O'Brien, Thomas appeared with Betty Grable in the musical Call Me Mister (1951). He then starred in The Jazz Singer opposite the popular contemporary vocalist Peggy Lee, a 1952 remake of the 1927 original. He portrayed songwriter Gus Kahn opposite Doris Day in the 1951 film biography I'll See You in My Dreams.

Music 
In 1952, Thomas recorded several Arabic folk songs with Toufic Barham for a Saint Jude Hospital Foundation fundraiser record. The songs later appeared on the re-issue album The Music of Arab-Americans: A Retrospective Collection. From 1952 through 1974, Thomas also recorded a number of vocal albums on his own, as well as participating on other albums.

Television career

Make Room for Daddy (The Danny Thomas Show) 
Thomas enjoyed a successful 11-year run (1953–1964) on Make Room for Daddy, later known as The Danny Thomas Show. Jean Hagen, Sherry Jackson, and Rusty Hamer were his first family. The Hagen character died offscreen in 1956 and was replaced by Marjorie Lord; Angela Cartwright also joined the cast at this time playing Danny's stepdaughter. Sherry Jackson left the series in 1958, and Penny Parker replaced her in the 1959–1960 season. Parker was written out of the series with her marriage to the character Patrick Hannigan, played by comedian Pat Harrington, Jr.

On January 1, 1959, Thomas appeared with his other Make Room for Daddy child stars, Angela Cartwright and Rusty Hamer, in an episode of NBC's The Ford Show, Starring Tennessee Ernie Ford.

The show was produced at Desilu Studios, where Lucille Ball was appearing alongside Desi Arnaz in I Love Lucy, and it featured several guest stars who went on to star in their own shows, including Andy Griffith (The Andy Griffith Show, Mayberry RFD), Joey Bishop, and Bill Bixby (My Favorite Martian and others). He also scored a major success at the London Palladium, in the years when many big American stars appeared there. In 1963, in an episode called "Oh, the Clancys," the Clancy Brothers and Tommy Makem appeared as Marjorie Lord's Irish cousins and sang "Brennan on the Moore."

In 1970, the program was revived for a season under the title Make Room for Granddaddy.

Angela Cartwright (who spoke about her on- and off-camera relationship with her television stepfather, Danny Thomas, on a groundbreaking ABC TV show, Make Room for Daddy) had said: "I thought Danny was hilarious and he was always cracking me up. He was loud and gregarious, nothing like my real dad who is far more reserved than that. So, it was fun to be able to make smart remarks and get away with it. I would never have talked to my real parents that way, but in the make-believe world of the Williams family I got away with that." Cartwright also added that by the time Thomas' show had ended, she wanted to join the cast of The Sound of Music: "I went on an interview for the part of Brigitta. I was still filming The Danny Thomas Show, but I knew the series was coming to an end. After several auditions, I was the first von Trapp cast. I asked Danny Thomas if he would let me out of my contract so I could be in the movie and he was very gracious to let me out of the last show of the season. He didn't have to do that and I am very grateful he did."

The Wonderful World of Burlesque 
In 1965 and 1966, Thomas presented The Wonderful World of Burlesque, featuring Lucille Ball, Jerry Lewis, Don Adams, Carol Channing, Andy Griffith, Sheldon Leonard, and Shirley Jones.

The Danny Thomas Hour 
The Danny Thomas Hour is an American anthology television series that was broadcast on NBC during the 1967–1968 television season.

Producer 
Thomas became a successful television producer (with Sheldon Leonard and Aaron Spelling among his partners) of The Dick Van Dyke Show, The Andy Griffith Show, That Girl and The Mod Squad. Thomas also produced three series for Walter Brennan: The Real McCoys, The Tycoon, and The Guns of Will Sonnett on ABC during the late 1950s and 1960s. Thomas often appeared in cameos on shows he produced, including his portrayal of the tuxedoed, droll alien Kolak, from the planet Twilo, in the Dick Van Dyke Show science-fiction spoof, "It May Look Like a Walnut".

Thomas was responsible for Mary Tyler Moore's first "big break" in acting. In 1961, Carl Reiner cast her in The Dick Van Dyke Show after Thomas personally recommended Moore. He had remembered her as "the girl with three names" whom he had turned down earlier, but rediscovered her after a lengthy search through photos and records.

Return to television 
In the early 1970s, Thomas reunited most of his second Daddy cast (Marjorie Lord, Rusty Hamer, and Angela Cartwright) for a short-lived update of the show, Make Room for Granddaddy. Premised around Danny and Kathy Williams caring for their grandson by daughter Terry, who was away with her husband who was serving in the Military, and stationed in Japan, the show lasted one season.

By the mid-1970s, Thomas' son Tony had become an accomplished television producer. Tony, along with Paul Junger Witt, formed Witt/Thomas Productions in 1975, and was responsible for his father's next three (and ultimately final) starring vehicles. Thomas returned to series TV in the NBC sitcom, The Practice, from January 1976 to January 1977, and after that I'm a Big Girl Now, which aired on ABC from 1980 to 1981.

Thomas was guest of honor in The Dean Martin Celebrity Roast that aired December 15, 1976, on NBC. He guest-starred in "In Full Command," the March 18, 1978, series finale of the long-running detective drama Kojak, as a corrupt superior officer in the police department, in an episode directed by series star Telly Savalas. He also appeared in the 1988 TV movie Side by Side, opposite Milton Berle and Sid Caesar.

The last series in which Thomas was a headlining star was One Big Family, which aired in syndication during the 1986–1987 season. The situation comedy's premise was set around a semi-retired comedian whose grandchildren were orphaned after their parents were killed in a car accident.

Commercials 
Thomas, like many actors prominent in television, endorsed commercial products. In particular, two companies that featured him in their advertising were Maxwell House, whose instant coffee he endorsed (though it had no decaffeinated variant at the time, he later claimed he had been endorsing a "decaffeinated" instant coffee and the coffee he actually drank had a high caffeine content), and Philips Norelco's "Dial-A-Brew" version of its short-lived "Better Cup Of Coffee" line of electric drip coffee-makers. One of his other "commercials" was actually a public-service message, with fund-raising goals, for St. Jude Children's Research Hospital.

Philanthropy 
As a "starving actor", Thomas had made a vow: If he found success, he would open a shrine dedicated to St. Jude Thaddeus, the patron saint of hopeless causes. After becoming a successful actor in the early 1950s, his wife joined him and began traveling the United States to help raise funds to build St. Jude Children's Research Hospital. He fervently believed "no child should die in the dawn of life." With help from Dr. Lemuel Diggs and close friend Anthony Abraham, an auto magnate in Miami, Florida, Thomas founded the St. Jude Children's Research Hospital in Memphis, Tennessee, in 1962. Since its inception, St. Jude has treated children from all 50 states and around the world, continuing the mission of finding cures and saving children. Dr. Peter C. Doherty of St. Jude's Immunology Department, was a co-recipient of the Nobel Prize in Physiology or Medicine in 1996 for key discoveries on how the immune system works to kill virus-infected cells.

St. Jude's has grown to include eight affiliate hospitals across the United States. It is a 501(c)(3) nonprofit organization with annual expenses, as of 2018, of over $1.4 billion funded by nearly $1.5 billion in donations. Further, the World Health Organization has named St. Jude's as its first "Collaborating Center for Childhood Cancer" to help increase survival rates on rare pediatric cancer from 20% to as much as 60% by 2030.

Personal life 

Danny Thomas was a struggling young comic when he met Rose Marie Mantell (born Rose Marie Cassaniti) (1914–2000), who had a singing career with her own radio show in Detroit, Michigan, and was the daughter of Marie "Mary" Cassaniti (1896–1972), a drummer and percussionist for "Marie's Merry Music Makers". They were married on January 15, 1936, and had three children, Margaret Julia ("Marlo"), Theresa ("Terre"), and Charles Anthony ("Tony") Thomas. The Thomas children followed their parents into entertainment in various capacities—Marlo as an actress and producer, Tony as a television producer, and Terre as an accomplished singer-songwriter. Danny's brother, Thomas Yaqoob, using the name Tom Jacobs, appeared on Make Room For Daddy and The Andy Griffith Show.

Thomas was initiated to the Freemasonry in Prudence Lodge No. 958, Chicago, passed, and raised to the sublime degree of Master Mason at Gothic Lodge #270 F&AM located at Hamilton Square, New Jersey, on March 15, 1984, by special dispensation of the New Jersey Grand Master. During May 1985, he was made a 32° Mason and also a Noble in Al Malaikah Shrine located at Los Angeles, California. Thomas also filmed the introduction to the Masonic Service Association's movie, When the Band Stops Playing.

A devout Roman Catholic, Thomas was named a Knight Commander of the Order of the Holy Sepulchre by Pope Paul VI in recognition of his services to the church and the community. He was a member of the Good Shepherd Parish and the Catholic Motion Picture Guild in Beverly Hills, California. In 1983, President Ronald Reagan presented Thomas with a Congressional Gold Medal honoring him for his work with St. Jude Children's Research Hospital. Thomas was one of the original owners of the Miami Dolphins, along with Joe Robbie, but he sold his share soon after the purchase. He was an avid golfer, claimed a ten golf handicap, and competed with Sam Snead in a charity event. Two PGA Tour tournaments bore his name: the Danny Thomas-Diplomat Classic in south Florida in 1969 and, along with co-founder Vernon Bell, the Danny Thomas Memphis Classic from 1970 to 1984. He was also the first non-Jewish member of the Hillcrest Country Club in Los Angeles.

In 1990, Danny Thomas was inducted into the Television Hall of Fame.

Death 

In 1991, Thomas died after a heart attack at his home in Beverly Hills, a hospital spokesman said. Two days previously he had celebrated St. Jude Hospital's 29th anniversary and filmed a commercial, which aired posthumously. He is interred in a mausoleum on the grounds of the St. Jude Children's Research Hospital in Memphis, Tennessee, alongside his wife.

Awards and honors 
A park in Toledo, Ohio, bears Thomas' name and a monument.

A stretch of roadway in Memphis is locally known as Danny Thomas Boulevard. The road, built in the 1960s to partially reroute U.S. Highway 51 around downtown, runs from E.H. Crump Boulevard (U.S. 70/79/64) to North Parkway/A.W. Willis Avenue (Tennessee State Route 1), passing through St. Jude Children's Research Hospital's campus on a viaduct.

For Thomas' contribution to the television industry, in February 1960 he was honored with a star on the Hollywood Walk of Fame located at 6901 Hollywood Boulevard.

Thomas was a posthumous recipient of the 2004 Bob Hope Humanitarian Award.

In 1965, Danny Thomas was appointed as a Special Deputy Sheriff by Ben Clark, who was a long standing Riverside County Sheriff and a recognized "trail blazer" in terms of professionalizing the law enforcement profession in California and the United States.

On February 16, 2012, the United States Postal Service issued a first-class forever stamp honoring Thomas as an entertainer and humanitarian. The Danny Thomas Forever Stamp shows an oil-on-panel painting depicting a smiling, tuxedo-clad Thomas in the foreground and St. Jude Children's Research Hospital in the background.

Filmography

References

External links 

 

Biography at the Museum Broadcast Communications
"Danny Thomas Story" at St. Jude
St. Jude Children's Research Hospital
Danny Thomas receives the Congressional Gold Medal from President Ronald Reagan
 Portrait of comedian Danny Thomas, 1963 in Los Angeles Times Photographic Archive (Collection 1429). UCLA Library Special Collections, Charles E. Young Research Library, University of California, Los Angeles.

1912 births
1991 deaths
Male actors from Toledo, Ohio
Arab-American culture in Ohio
American male comedians
20th-century American comedians
American male film actors
Philanthropists from New York (state)
American male television actors
Television producers from New York (state)
American male radio actors
American people of Lebanese descent
Burials in Tennessee
Congressional Gold Medal recipients
Respiratory disease deaths in California
Deaths from pneumothorax
Outstanding Performance by a Lead Actor in a Comedy Series Primetime Emmy Award winners
Male actors from Detroit
People from Lenawee County, Michigan
Male actors from Rochester, New York
Myrrh Records artists
RCA Victor artists
St. Jude Children's Research Hospital
20th-century American male actors
20th-century American businesspeople
Knights of the Holy Sepulchre
American Freemasons
Roman Catholic Freemasons
Nightclub performers
Musicians from Rochester, New York
Catholics from Michigan
University of Toledo alumni
Television producers from Michigan